Scopula psephis is a moth of the  family Geometridae. It is found in South Africa.

References

Endemic moths of South Africa
Moths described in 1935
Taxa named by Louis Beethoven Prout
psephis
Moths of Africa